Aspilota vicina is a species of insect from the Braconidae family. The scientific name of this species was first published in 2007 by Belokobylskij. This species is native to the Russian Far East.

References

Braconidae